Ilyodon is a genus of splitfins found in the Pacific slope river basins of Balsas, Tuxpan (Coahuayana), Purificación, Chacala (Marabasco), Armería and Ameca in western Mexico.

Species
There are currently five recognized species in this genus according to FishBase, but only I. furcidens and I. whitei are indisputably valid (the remaining are then considered variants of those two).

 Ilyodon cortesae Paulo-Maya & Trujillo-Jiménez, 2000 (Freckled Splitfin)
 Ilyodon furcidens (D. S. Jordan & C. H. Gilbert, 1882) (Goldbreast Splitfin)
 Ilyodon lennoni M. K. Meyer & W. Förster, 1983 (Chacambero Splitfin)
 Ilyodon whitei (Meek, 1904) (Balsas Splitfin)
 Ilyodon xantusi C. L. Hubbs & C. L. Turner, 1939 (Limones Splitfin)

References 

 
Goodeinae
Freshwater fish genera
Taxa named by Carl H. Eigenmann
Ray-finned fish genera
Taxonomy articles created by Polbot